O sole mio is a 1946 Italian film, directed by Giacomo Gentilomo. It is considered one of the earliest films belonging to the genre of Italian neorealism, due to its use of exterior scenes and the inclusion of non-professional actors.

The film is set during the Four days of Naples in September 1943. Its title refers to the Neapolitan song "’O sole mio".

Tito Gobbi stars as an Italian-American officer who is parachuted behind Axis lines to gather information on the movements of the German army and facilitate the allied landing. In Naples he comes into contact with local resistance groups and ordinary citizens, who then join in the revolt against the German occupiers.

See also
Cinema of Italy

External links

1946 films
1946 war films
Italian war films
1940s Italian-language films
Films about Italian resistance movement
Films set in Naples
Italian Campaign of World War II films
Films directed by Giacomo Gentilomo
Italian black-and-white films
Italian World War II films
1940s Italian films